Phymanthidae is a family of sea anemones belonging to the order Actiniaria.

Genera:
 Epicystes Ehrenberg, 1834
 Heteranthus Klunzinger, 1877
 Phymanthus Milne Edwards & Haime, 1851

References

 
Actinioidea
Cnidarian families